Boylu is a village in the Şirvan District of Siirt Province in Turkey. The village is populated by Kurds of the Silokan tribe and had a population of 352 in 2021.

The hamlets of Ayranı, Horgüç, Karaye and Kumu are attached to Boylu.

References 

Kurdish settlements in Siirt Province
Villages in Şirvan District